Bucktown is an unincorporated community in Dorchester County, in the U.S. state of Maryland.

History
A post office was established at Bucktown in 1856, and remained in operation until 1907.
David M. Corkran was postmaster in 1859.

Notable person

Harriet Tubman, African-American abolitionist and political activist, was a slave on the Brodess plantation near Bucktown.

References

Unincorporated communities in Maryland
Unincorporated communities in Dorchester County, Maryland